Kulasekharam is a town located in the district of Kanyakumari, Tamil Nadu, India. It is one of the most important business centres in the district, after Marthandam. 

Kulasekharam has many rubber plantations that yield high quality latex, which is the town's major revenue source. The town is making inroads and valuable contribution in the field of healthcare, by providing impeccable medical facilities to the semi-rural crowd from nearby places. Kulasekharam has three medical colleges for medical sciences, Homeopathy and Naturopathy. Kulasekharam has a mix of Hindu, Christian,and Muslim communities and has historically been a peaceful town. Malayalees and Tamilians form the majority of the population.

Etymology
Kulasekhara is the name of a dynasty that ruled over Kerala, from which the name may have been derived. Kulasekharam and its nearby places holds great royal heritage. Kulasekharam was a part of Travancore kingdom.

Administration 
Kulasekharam is a town panchayat located in Kanyakumari district, and comes under Thiruvattar Taluk. It has 18 wards in the panchayat. The elected Councilors are responsible for the development of their wards. Drainage facilities, local roads, and water facilities are maintained by them.

Police station 
The Kulasekharam Police station is located at Arasumoodu.

Fire control 
The Fire Control Station is located in Mamoodu.

Tourism 
Kulasekharam is named for its scenic views, but it doesn't have any important tourist spots within the town limits but it serves as a key place to reach various tourist destinations in Kanyakumari district, such as Thirparappu, Mathur Aqueduct, Pechipara dam, perunchani reservoir, and Kothayar dam. The Thripparappu waterfalls and Pechippara Dam are the main tourist attractions in the state. Kothayar has a hydroelectric power plant and is situated in a dense forest area. And it has one more nature viewed place called kalikesam. The kalikesam have water falls, rocks and historical temple.

Education 
Kulasekharam holds a prominent place in the educational map of Tamil Nadu, especially in medical studies. The town is home to three medical colleges, four nursing colleges, and other colleges and schools.

Medical colleges 
 Sree RamaKrishna Medical College of Naturopathy and Yogic Sciences
 Sree Mookaambika Institute of Medical Sciences (SMIMS)
 Sarada Krishna Homeopathic Medical College
 Sree RAMAKRISHNA COLLEGE of Nursing

Dental colleges 
 Sree Mookaambika Institute of Dental Sciences

Arts & science 
 Sri Ramakrishna College of Education

Polytechnic college 
 BWDA polytechnic college

Agricultural college 
 TNAU Institute Of Horticulture Research Station

There are also more than 20 private education institutions in Kulasekaram, which offer education in various fields.

Location and significance 
Kulasekharam is located 50 km south of the Trivandrum Metropolitan Region and 30 km from Nagercoil the nearest city. Kulasekharam is only 12 km away from the commercial towns of Marthandam, 18 km from Thuckalay, Kaliyikkavilai and 22 km from Monday Market. The younger generations of Kulasekharam either migrated or commute to Trivandrum due to its proximity to Kerala's state capital. Two major motorways connect kulasekharam to Trivandrum; the National Highway 66 and the Vizhinjam Harbour - Beach Road. The Hill Road which runs through Nedumangadu is also used by some commuters due to heavy traffic congestion in the 2 main roads particularly during peak hours.

Demographics
 India census, Kulasekharam had a population of 17,267. Males constitute 49.5% of the population and females 50.5%. Kulasekharam has an average literacy rate of 90%, higher than the state average of 80.09%: male literacy is 92.54%, and female literacy is 88.91%. In Kulasekharam, 9.39% of the population is under 6 years of age.
Majority of population holds Nair and Nadar community. Also other castes such as Panikker( Ezhava), Viswakarma, Vannan, Paraya etc are living here. Once upon a time, Nair community possessed majority of land and other properties. They are very aristocratic and respectable community during the early period. Now all communities leading a peaceful life in Kulasekharam.

Medical facilities 
Kulasekharam has one government hospital, 3 medical college hospitals and more than 15 hospitals, which serve people in almost all kind of treatments.
There is also a government veterinary hospital located within Kulasekharam. People also do visit medical facilities available in Nagercoil, Marthandam and Trivandrum in which it includes Trivandrum Medical College, General Hospital, Thar Salvation Army Catherine Booth Hospital (CBH), KIMS, NIMS, Ananthapuri, Cosmopolitan Hospital, PRS, Lord's Hospital, Aster Medicity, etc.
There is a homeo medical College
Namely Saradha Krishna homeopathy medical College with a 100bedded hospital.

Shopping 
Kulasekharam Market is one of the important shopping centres for Kulasekharam and the nearby towns. Some 8000-10000 people gather there daily to buy their basic needs.

Climate 
Kulasekharam has a pleasant, though humid, climate for a majority of the year. Kulasekharam receives both the north-east monsoon and the south-west monsoon. It rains more often in Kanyakumari district than in any other part of Tamil Nadu, with the exception of Chennai.

Culture and Religion 
Malayalam and Tamil are spoken by the people. Tamil language along with English is used as a medium of teaching in all major schools. The Tamil spoken here is a mix of Malayalam and Tamil, sometimes unintelligible to the people of North Tamil Nadu.

The culture is a mixture of Malayalam and Tamil. Hinduism,Christianity and Islam are the major religions in Kulasekharam. Here there is a lot of Nair families holding Kerala culture. Once upon a time they are the royal aristocratic community in the region. There are many temples managing by different Nair families. Kulasekharam holds a great Nair community background. Nadar community is also a highly populated community here. Different communities keeps a good relationship between them. Here Keralite communities follows Kerala life style & culture and Tamil communities follows tamilian life style & culture. Food prepared here is also a mix of Kerala/Tamil Nadu traditions. Idly, Dosa, Puttu, Appam, and Idiappam are popular food items, and so are rice murukku and achu-murukku. Curries here are made with coconut and coconut oil which is now considered Kerala style cooking.

Festivals 
Some of the festivals celebrated here are Onam, Christmas, Pongal Deepavali, Easter, New Year's Day, Ramzan (Eid ul fitr) and Bakrid (Eid ul alha), Ganesh Chaturthi (Vinayagha Chaturthi), krishna Janmashtami (Krishna Jayanti), Sivalaya Ottam, Vishu,  Karthikai Deepam, Karkkadaka Vavu. Also other days such as Pradosham, Vaikunda Ekadashi, Aayilyam, Navarathri etc are celebrating here.

Transport

Road 
The only mode of transport in Kulasekharam is by road. SH90 & SH45 pass through Kulasekaram from major spots like Aralvaimozhi and Marthandam. SETC is operating a bus to Chennai daily at 3:00pm. It is also connected with Coimbatore, Madurai, Tirunelveli, Nagercoil, Kanyakumari, Nedumangadu, Thiruchendoor and Chennai. In Thumpacode there is a bus stand that serves the public.

Auto rickshaws, private cars, vans, and mini buses are the other modes of transport.

Train 
The nearest railway station from Kulasekharam is Kuzhithurai (KZT) which is just 10 km away. Several trains to Trivandrum, Nagercoil, Chennai, Madurai, and Mumbai are operated. One must reach Nagercoil (NCJ) or Trivandrum (TVC) for getting long-distance train and the trains which don't have halt in Kuzhithurai.

Air 
Kulasekharam is served by Trivandrum International Airport which is approximately 45 km away. Kulasekharam Town is only 16 km away from the southern border of Trivandrum Metropolitan Region and hence considered one of its suburbs even though it lies across the state border. Both Kerala and Tamil Nadu government operates several bus services between the two cities apart from numerous private bus and taxi operators.

Communication

Telecommunication 
State owned BSNL is offering land line, mobile, wireless and wired internet facility. Private companies include Airtel,  Vi [Vodafone Idea] and Jio. Airtel is offering their 3G services in Kulasekharam from September 2011 & BSNL 3G from November 2013, Vodafone 3G and Aircel 3G (not in operation) has launched around May 2015, Reliance Jio 4G services are also available.
Even other network provider started up with 4G services

Postal 
Kulasekharam head post office is in Arasumoodu Jn. Various services like postal, speed post, parcel service, and banking service are also offered here. The Postal Index Number for Kulasekharam post office is 629161.

Religious Institutions
 Kulasekharam Chembakappara Sri. Balabbhadra Devi Temple, Kavuvilai, Cheruppalur
 Manalikkara Sri Bhadrakali Devi Temple, Kulasekharam
 Ittakaveli Mudippura Sri Neelakeshi Amman Temple, Kulasekharam

References

External links 

Cities and towns in Kanyakumari district